Freda may refer to:

 Frida (given name), also spelled Freda
 Freda (surname)
Freda (character) from The Lord of the Rings film trilogy
 Ford Freda, a motor vehicle introduced in the Japanese market in 1995
 Freda Sandstone, a member of the Oronto Group of sandstones in Wisconsin
Freda (tortoise), a pet featured in UK children's TV series Blue Peter
 Freda', a pop group from Sweden
 Freda (film), a 2021 film
 "Freda", an 2013 episode of Aqua Teen Hunger Force
 Typhoon Freda, tropical cyclones named Freda

Places
 Freda, Michigan, a former mining town in the Upper Peninsula of Michigan, United States
Freda Township, Grant County, North Dakota, a township in North Dakota, United States
Freda, North Dakota, an unincorporated community and ghost town within the township of the same name
Freda, Kaunas, a neighbourhood of Kaunas
Fredrikinkatu, a street in Helsinki, Finland, nicknamed Freda
1093 Freda, a minor planet

See also
 includes many people with forename Freda
Fred (disambiguation)
Frida (disambiguation), includes Frida, Frieda, and Freida